Inglemoor High School is a public high school located in Kenmore, Washington, United States. It is one of the largest high schools in the state of Washington and has an average of 30 students per teacher. As of 2017, the student population was approximately 1,600 students in grades 9–12. Starting from the 2017 school year, the school accommodates 9th grade as well. Inglemoor's feeder schools are Kenmore Middle School and Northshore Middle School, and Arrowhead, Kenmore, Lockwood, Moorlands, Shelton View, and Woodmoor Elementary Schools. In addition, Inglemoor accepts waivers due to the popularity of its International Baccalaureate program.

Academics 
Newsweek has ranked Inglemoor in the top two percent of US high schools and has named Inglemoor as one of the "Best American High Schools." Students at Inglemoor have an average reading proficiency of 88.7% and a math proficiency of 75.2%. Inglemoor students consistently score higher than the average district and state student. The adjusted 4-year cohort graduation rate for the class of 2013 was 94.7%, whereas Northshore School District's corresponding rate is 89.6% and Washington State's is 76.0%. In 2007, Inglemoor was honored as a No Child Left Behind Blue Ribbon School, one of only 238 public schools nationwide to be honored, for its consistently high performance in reading and math.

Of the 522 graduates from Inglemoor's class of 2013, 82% are reported as going to college. Of these college bound graduates, 42% are going to a public 4-year school in Washington, 5% to a private 4-year school in Washington, 32% to a public 2-year school in Washington, 0-1% in a private 2-year school in Washington, and 21% to out of state schools (8% public 4-year, 11% private 4-year, 2% public 2-year, 0-1% private 2-year). Compared to Northshore School District, Inglemoor's class 2013 has a higher percentage of students going to college (82% vs. 77%). Of 2013 graduates across Washington State, 62% were enrolled in postsecondary education. Graduates of Inglemoor's class of 2013 are disproportionally enrolled in public 4-year Washington schools (42% vs. 31% statewide).

Demographics 
As of October 2013, 63.8% of Inglemoor students identified as White, 18.0% as Asian/Pacific Islander, 17.5% as Asian, 10.2% as Hispanic/Latino of any race, 5.3% as two or more races, 2.3% as Black/African American, 0.5% as Native Hawaiian/other Pacific Islander, and 0.4% as American Indian/Alaskan Native.
As of 2011, 69.7% of Inglemoor students identify as White, 15.2% as Asian, 8.2% as Hispanic/Latino of Any Race, 1.9% as African American/Black, 0.7% as Native Hawaiian/Other Pacific Islander, 0.6% as American Indian/Alaska Native, and 3.8% as Two or More Races.

In the Northshore School District where Inglemoor is located, the median household income is at $235,102 compared to a state median of $72,098. The median home value is $410,375, compared to a state median of $160,737. As of May 2014, 15.2% of the student population takes part in the Free or Reduced Price Meals program, compared to 17.3% in Northshore School District, and 45.9% in Washington State as a whole.

International Baccalaureate 
Led by Chris McQueen, Amy Monaghan, and Elizabeth Lund, Inglemoor High School has offered the International Baccalaureate program since 1997. As of 2011, it  is one of eighteen high schools in Washington State to offer the IB program, and its IB program is considered the largest in the Pacific Northwest. In 2012, 21% of IB diploma students were from Inglemoor. From the years 1999 to 2012 the IB diploma pass rate at Inglemoor was 91% in comparison to the world average of 78%.

Extracurricular activities

Athletics 
Inglemoor's sports teams play in the KingCo 4A conference, and in many cases use Pop Keeney Stadium, located in Bothell, Washington, as their home field.

The girls' swim and dive team has earned four state championships.

Inglemoor's main rivals are the Bothell Cougars.

Inglemoor participates in a range of sports, including:
 Baseball
 Badminton
 Boys' and girls' basketball
 Bowling
 Crew
 Cross country
 Football
 Boys' and girls' golf
 Gymnastics
 Boys' and girls' soccer
 Boys' and girls' swim and dive
 Boys' and girls' tennis
 Track and field
 Volleyball
 Boys' and girls' water polo
 Wrestling

Music
Inglemoor is known for its music program. Its marching band has won many different awards, and its Wind Ensemble is nationally known, playing at Carnegie Hall and Lincoln Center in April 2015 along with the Inglemoor Orchestra.  The marching band performs during football season, with halftime shows consisting of the high-step marching style, highly influenced by the University of Washington's Husky Marching Band. During the boys' and girls' basketball season the program supports each team with pep bands. In the Vancouver Heritage Festival of 2017, five of Inglemoor's instrumental groups and three vocal groups all won First Place Gold in their respective categories, sweeping all of the sections they entered in.

Theater 
The Inglemoor Theatre program includes an improv team.

DECA 
Inglemoor's DECA Chapter was ranked number one in the world for several years until 2016 when they ranked 10th at DECA's International Career Development Conference. In 2011, Inglemoor qualified 40 competitors for international competition and saw 25 members attain top 10 or higher honors, including four international champions and five-second place winners in three events.

Notable alumni 
D.D. Acholonu - Houston Texans and Montreal Alouettes linebacker
Anthony Arena - professional soccer player for the Houston Dynamo.
Michael Dahlquist - musician in the band Silkworm
Korel Engin - gold medal basketball player
Jamie Finch - professional soccer player for the Carolina RailHawks.
Jeff Gove - professional golfer
Bobby Jenks - Boston Red Sox setup man
Blake Lewis - American Idol finalist
Alyssa London - Miss Alaska USA 2017
Evan Meek - Pittsburgh Pirates relief pitcher
Deanna Mustard - voice actress, notably Princess Daisy in the Super Mario video games 
Terry Rennaker - former linebacker for the Seattle Seahawks
Sabzi - musician
Charissa Thompson - ESPN personality
Steve Fossen - Heart band Roger Fisher - Heart band

References

External links
 Inglemoor High School website
 http://www.schoolmatters.com
 Vikings' men and women swim teams practice at Carole Ann Wald Pool at Saint Edward State Park - See Seminary External Links

High schools in King County, Washington
International Baccalaureate schools in Washington (state)
Public high schools in Washington (state)